Adrian Stead (born 20 February 1967) is a sailor from Poole, Great Britain. who represented his country at the 1996 Summer Olympics in Savannah, United States as crew member in the Soling. With helmsman Andy Beadsworth and fellow crew member Barry Parkin they took the 4th place. 
He is one of Britain's most successful sailors winning World Championships in the Swan 60 OD in 2013 the Farr 40 in 1998, 2007, 2008) the RC44 (20??) & 2016 and the TP 52 in 2010, 2011 and 2013

References

External links
  (archive)
 
 

1967 births
Living people
British male sailors (sport)
Olympic sailors of Great Britain
Sailors at the 1992 Summer Olympics – Flying Dutchman
Sailors at the 1996 Summer Olympics – Soling
World champions in sailing for Great Britain
Swan 60 class world champions
Farr 40 class world champions
RC44 class world champions
TP52 class world champions
Sportspeople from Poole